The Kingdom of the Two Sicilies was a kingdom in Southern Italy from 1816 to 1860. The kingdom was the largest sovereign state by population and size in Italy before Italian unification, comprising Sicily and all of the Italian Peninsula south of the Papal States, which covered most of the area of today's Mezzogiorno.

The kingdom was formed when the Kingdom of Sicily merged with the Kingdom of Naples, which was officially also known as the Kingdom of Sicily. Since both kingdoms were named Sicily, they were collectively known as the "Two Sicilies" (Utraque Sicilia, literally "both Sicilies"), and the unified kingdom adopted this name. The king of the Two Sicilies was overthrown by Giuseppe Garibaldi in 1860, after which the people voted in a plebiscite to join the Savoyard Kingdom of Sardinia. The annexation of the Kingdom of the Two Sicilies completed the first phase of Italian unification, and the new Kingdom of Italy was proclaimed in 1861.

The Two Sicilies were heavily agricultural, like the other Italian states.

Name
The name "Two Sicilies" originated from the partition of the medieval Kingdom of Sicily. Until 1285, the island of Sicily and the Mezzogiorno were constituent parts of the Kingdom of Sicily. As a result of the War of the Sicilian Vespers (1282–1302), the King of Sicily lost the Island of Sicily (also called Trinacria) to the Crown of Aragon, but remained ruler over the peninsular part of the realm. Although his territory became known unofficially as the Kingdom of Naples, he and his successors never gave up the title "King of Sicily" and still officially referred to their realm as the "Kingdom of Sicily". At the same time, the Aragonese rulers of the Island of Sicily also called their realm the "Kingdom of Sicily". Thus, there were two kingdoms called "Sicily": hence, the Two Sicilies. This is readopted by Two Sicilies national football team, an Italian football club since December 2008.

Background

Origins of the two kingdoms

In 1130 the Norman king Roger II formed the Kingdom of Sicily by combining the County of Sicily with the southern part of the Italian Peninsula (then known as the Duchy of Apulia and Calabria) as well as with the Maltese Islands. The capital of this kingdom was Palermo, which is on the island of Sicily.

During the reign of Charles I of Anjou (1266–1285), the War of the Sicilian Vespers (1282–1302) split the kingdom. Charles, who was of French origin, lost the island of Sicily to the House of Barcelona, who were from Aragon and Catalonia. Charles remained king of the peninsular region, which became informally known as the Kingdom of Naples. Officially Charles never gave up the title of "The Kingdom of Sicily"; thus there existed two separate kingdoms calling themselves "Sicily".

Aragonese and Spanish direct rule

Only with the Peace of Caltabellotta (1302), sponsored by Pope Boniface VIII, did the two kings of "Sicily" recognize each other's legitimacy; the island kingdom then became the "Kingdom of Trinacria" in official contexts, though the populace still called it Sicily. In 1442, Alfonso V of Aragon, king of insular Sicily, conquered Naples and became king of both.

Alfonso V called his kingdom in Latin "Regnum Utriusque Siciliæ", meaning "Kingdom of both Sicilies". At the death of Alfonso in 1458, the kingdom again became divided between his brother John II of Aragon, who kept the island of Sicily, and his illegitimate son Ferdinand, who became King of Naples. In 1501, King Ferdinand II of Aragon, the son of John II, agreed to help Louis XII of France conquer Naples and Milan. After Frederick IV was forced to abdicate, the French took power, and Louis reigned as Louis III of Naples for three years. Negotiations to divide the region failed, and the French soon began unsuccessful attempts to force the Spanish out of the peninsula.

After the French lost the Battle of Garigliano (1503), they left the kingdom. Ferdinand II then re-united the two areas into one kingdom. From 1516, when Charles V, Holy Roman Emperor, became the first king of Spain, both Naples and Sicily came under direct Holy Roman Empire rule and after that navigated between Habsburg and Spanish Rule  In 1530 Charles V granted the islands of Malta and Gozo, which had been part of the Kingdom of Sicily, to the Knights Hospitaller (thereafter known as the Order of Malta). At the end of the War of the Spanish Succession, the Treaty of Utrecht in 1713 granted Sicily to the Duke of Savoy, until the Treaty of Rastatt in 1714 left Naples to the Emperor Charles VI. In the 1720 Treaty of The Hague, the Emperor and Savoy exchanged Sicily for Sardinia, thus reuniting Naples and Sicily.

History

1816–1848

The Treaty of Casalanza restored Ferdinand IV of Bourbon to the throne of Naples and the island of Sicily (where the constitution of 1812 virtually had disempowered him) was returned to him. In 1816 he annulled the constitution and Sicily became fully reintegrated into the new state, which was now officially called the Regno delle Due Sicilie (Kingdom of Two Sicilies). Ferdinand IV became Ferdinand I.

A number of accomplishments under the administration of Kings Joseph and Joachim Murat, such as the Code Civil, the penal and commercial code, were kept (and extended to Sicily). In the mainland parts of the Kingdom, the power and influence of both nobility and clergy had been greatly reduced, though at the expense of law and order. Brigandage and the forceful occupation of lands were problems the restored Kingdom inherited from its predecessors.

The Vienna Congress had granted Austria the right to station troops in the kingdom, and Austria, as well as Russia and Prussia, insisted that no written constitution was to be granted to the kingdom. In October 1815, Joachim Murat landed in Calabria, in an attempt to regain his kingdom. The government responded to acts of collaboration or of terrorism with severe repression and by June 1816 Murat's attempt had failed and the situation was under government control. However, the Neapolitan administration had changed from conciliatory to reactionary policies. The French novelist Henri de Stendhal, who visited Naples in 1817, called the kingdom "an absurd monarchy in the style of Philip II".

As open political activity was suppressed, liberals organized themselves in secret societies, such as the Carbonari, an organization whose origins date back into the French period and which had been outlawed in 1816. In 1820 a revolution planned by Carbonari and their supporters, aimed at obtaining a written constitution (the Spanish constitution of 1812), did not work out as planned. Nevertheless, King Ferdinand felt compelled to grant the constitution sought by the liberals (13 July). That same month, a revolution broke out in Palermo, Sicily, but was quickly suppressed. Rebels from Naples occupied Benevento and Pontecorvo, two enclaves belonging to the Papal States. At the Congress of Troppau (Nov. 19th), the Holy Alliance (Metternich being the driving force) decided to intervene. On 23 February 1821, in front of 50,000 Austrian troops paraded outside his capital, King Ferdinand cancelled the constitution. An attempt at Neapolitan resistance to the Austrians by regular forces under General Guglielmo Pepe, as well as by irregular rebel forces (Carbonari), was smashed and on 24 March 1821 Austrian forces entered the city of Naples.

Political repression then only intensified. Lawlessness in the countryside was aggravated by the problem of administrative corruption. A coup attempted in 1828 and aimed at forcing the promulgation of a constitution was suppressed by Neapolitan troops (the Austrian troops had left the previous year). King Francis I (1825-1830) died after having visited Paris, where he witnessed the 1830 revolution. In 1829 he had created the Royal Order of Merit (Royal Order of Francis I of the Two Sicilies). His successor Ferdinand II declared a political amnesty and undertook steps to stimulate the economy, including reduction of taxation. Eventually the city of Naples would be equipped with street lighting and in 1839 the railroad from Naples to Portici was put into operation, measures that were visible signs of progress. However, as to the railroad, the Church still objected to the construction of tunnels, because of their 'obscenity'.

In 1836 the Kingdom was struck by a cholera epidemic which killed 65,000 in Sicily alone. In the following years the Neapolitan countryside saw sporadic local insurrections. In the 1840s, clandestine political pamphlets circulated, evading censorship. Moreover, in September 1847 an uprising saw insurrectionists crossing from mainland Calabria over to Sicily before government forces were able to suppress them. On 13 January 1848, an open rebellion began in Palermo and demands were made for the reintroduction of the 1812 constitution. King Ferdinand II appointed a liberal prime minister, broke off diplomatic relations with Austria and even declared war on the latter (7 April). Although revolutionaries who had risen in several mainland cities outside Naples shortly after the Sicilians approved of the new measures (April 1848), Sicily continued with her revolution. Faced with these differing reactions to his moves, King Ferdinand, using the Swiss Guard, took the initiative and ordered the suppression of the revolution in Naples (15 May) and by July the mainland was again under royal control and by September, also Messina. Palermo, the revolutionaries' capital and last stronghold, fell to the government some months later on 15 May 1849.

1848–1861

The Kingdom of Two Sicilies, in the course of 1848–1849, had been able to suppress the revolution and the attempt of Sicilian secession with their own forces, hired Swiss Guards included. The war declared on Austria in April 1848, under pressure of public sentiment, had been an event on paper only.

In 1849 King Ferdinand II was 39 years old.  He had begun as a reformer; the early death of his wife (1836), the frequency of political unrest, the extent and range of political expectations on the side of various groups that made up public opinion, had caused him to pursue a cautious, yet authoritarian policy aiming at the prevention of the occurrence of yet another rebellion. Over half of the delegates elected to parliament in the liberal atmosphere of 1848 were arrested or fled the country. The administration, in their treatment of political prisoners, in their observation of 'suspicious elements', violated the rights of the individual guaranteed by the constitution. Conditions were so bad that they caused international attention; in 1856 Britain and France demanded the release of the political prisoners. When this was rejected, both countries broke off diplomatic relations. The Kingdom pursued an economic policy of protectionism; the country's economy was mainly based on agriculture, the cities, especially Naples – with over 400,000 inhabitants, Italy's largest – "a center of consumption rather than of production" (Santore p. 163) and home to poverty most expressed by the masses of Lazzaroni, the poorest class.

After visiting Naples in 1850, Gladstone began to support Neapolitan opponents of the Bourbon rulers: his "support" consisted of a couple of letters that he sent from Naples to the Parliament in London, describing the "awful conditions" of the Kingdom of Southern Italy and claiming that "it is the negation of God erected to a system of government". Gladstone's letters provoked sensitive reactions in the whole of Europe and helped to cause its diplomatic isolation before the invasion and annexation of the Kingdom of the Two Sicilies by the Kingdom of Sardinia, with the following foundation of modern Italy. Administratively, Naples and Sicily remained separate units; in 1858 the Neapolitan Postal Service issued her first postage stamps; that of Sicily followed in 1859. 
 
Until 1849, the political movement among the bourgeoisie, at times revolutionary, had been Neapolitan respectively Sicilian rather than Italian in its tendency; Sicily in 1848-1849 had striven for a higher degree of independence from Naples rather than for a unified Italy. As public sentiment for Italian unification was rather low in the Kingdom of the Two Sicilies, the country did not feature as an object of acquisition in the earlier plans of Piemont-Sardinia's prime minister Cavour. Only when Austria was defeated in 1859 and the unification of Northern Italy (except Venetia) was accomplished in 1860, did Giuseppe Garibaldi, at the head of the Expedition of the Thousand, launch his invasion of Sicily, with the connivance of Cavour (once in Sicily, many rallied to his colours); after a successful campaign in Sicily, he crossed over to the mainland and won the battle of the Volturno with half of his army being local volunteers. King Francis II (since 1859) withdrew to the fortified port of Gaeta, where he surrendered and abdicated in February 1861 after the Siege of Gaeta. At the encounter of Teano, Garibaldi met King Victor Emmanuel, transferring to him the conquered kingdom, the Two Sicilies were annexed into the Kingdom of Sardinia, which became the Kingdom of Italy in 1861. What used to be the Kingdom of Two Sicilies became Italy's Mezzogiorno.

Arts patronage

The Teatro Reale di San Carlo commissioned by the Bourbon King Charles VII of Naples who wanted to grant Naples a new and larger theatre to replace the old, dilapidated, and too-small Teatro San Bartolomeo of 1621. Which had served the city well, especially after Scarlatti had moved there in 1682 and had begun to create an important opera centre which existed well into the 1700s. Thus, the San Carlo was inaugurated on 4 November 1737, the king's name day, with the performance of Domenico Sarro's opera Achille in Sciro and much admired for its architecture the San Carlo was now the biggest opera house in the world.On 13 February 1816 a fire broke out during a dress-rehearsal for a ballet performance and quickly spread to destroy a part of building. On the orders of King Ferdinand I, who used the services of Antonio Niccolini, to rebuild the opera house within ten months as a traditional horseshoe-shaped auditorium with 1,444 seats, and a proscenium, 33.5m wide and 30m high. The stage was 34.5m deep. Niccolini embellished in the inner of the bas-relief depicting "Time and the Hour". Stendhal attended the second night of the inauguration and wrote: "There is nothing in all Europe, I won't say comparable to this theatre, but which gives the slightest idea of what it is like..., it dazzles the eyes, it enraptures the soul...".

From 1815 to 1822, Gioachino Rossini was the house composer and artistic director of the royal opera houses, including the San Carlo. During this period he wrote ten operas which were Elisabetta, regina d'Inghilterra (1815), La gazzetta, Otello, ossia il Moro di Venezia (1816), Armida (1817), Mosè in Egitto, Ricciardo e Zoraide (1818), Ermione, Bianca e Falliero, Eduardo e Cristina, La donna del lago (1819), Maometto II (1820), and Zelmira (1822), many premiered at the San Carlo. An offer in 1822 from Domenico Barbaja, the impresario of the San Carlo, which followed the composer's ninth opera, led to Gaetano Donizetti's move to Naples and his residency there which lasted until the production of Caterina Cornaro in January 1844. In all, Naples presented 51 of Donizetti's operas. Also Vincenzo Bellini's first professionally staged opera had its first performance at the Teatro di San Carlo in Naples on 30 May 1826.

Historical population 

The kingdom had a large population, its capital Naples being the biggest city in Italy, at least three times as large as any other contemporary Italian state. At its peak, the kingdom had a military 100,000 soldiers strong, and a large bureaucracy. Naples was the largest city in the kingdom and the third largest city in Europe. The second largest city, Palermo, was the third largest in Italy. In the 1800s, the kingdom experienced large population growth, rising from approximately five to seven million. It held approximately 36% of Italy's population around 1850.

Because the kingdom did not establish a statistical department until after 1848, most population statistics before that year are estimates and censuses that were thought by contemporaries to be inaccurate.

Military
The Army of the Two Sicilies was the land forces of the Kingdom, it was created by the settlement of the Bourbon dynasty in Southern Italy following the events of the War of the Polish Succession. The army collapsed during the Expedition of the Thousand.

The Real Marina was the naval forces of the Kingdom. It was the most important of the pre-unification Italian navies.

Economy

A major problem in the Kingdom was the distribution of land property - most of it concentrated in the hands of a few families, the landed nobility. The villages housed a large rural proletariat, desperately poor and dependent on the landlords for work. The Kingdom's few cities had little industry, thus not providing the outlet excess rural population found in northern Italy, France or Germany. The figures above show that the population of the countryside rose at a faster rate than that of the city of Naples herself, a rather odd phenomenon in a time when much of Europe experienced the Industrial Revolution.

While underdeveloped compared to Northwest Italy and contemporary Western European countries at the time of unification in 1861, the average wage of the Two Sicilies was actually higher than Central Italy and on par with Northeast Italy.  The island of Sicily, in particular, was richer than the mainland part of the kingdom and its wages were very close to the northwest's.  The divergence increased massively after unification however, due to the complete collapse of the south's economy.

Agriculture

As registered in the 1827 census, for the Neapolitan (continental) part of the kingdom, 1,475,314 of the male population were listed as husbandmen which traditionally consisted of three classes the Borgesi (or yeomanry), the Inquilani (or small-farmers) and the Contadini (or peasantry), along with 65,225 listed as shepherds. Wheat, wine, olive oil and cotton were the chief products with an annual production, as recorded in 1844, of 67 million liters of olive oil largely produced in Apulia and Calabria and loaded for export at Gallipoli along with 191 million liters of wine that were for the most part consumed domestically. On the island of Sicily, in 1839, due to less arable lands, the output was much smaller than on the mainland yet approximately 115,000 acres of vineyards and about 260,000 acres of orchards, mainly fig, orange and citrus, were cultivated.

Industry
Industry was the largest source of income if compared with the other preunitarian states. One of the most important industrial complexes in the kingdom was the shipyard of Castellammare di Stabia, which employed 1800 workers. The engineering factory of Pietrarsa was the largest industrial plant in the Italian peninsula, producing tools, cannons, rails, locomotives. The complex also included a school for train drivers, and naval engineers and, thanks to this school, the kingdom was able to replace the English personnel who had been necessary until then. The first steamboat with screw propulsion known in the Mediterranean Sea was the "Giglio delle Onde", with mail delivery and passenger transport purposes after 1847.

In Calabria, the Fonderia Ferdinandea was a large foundry where cast iron was produced. The Reali ferriere ed Officine di Mongiana was an iron foundry and weapons factory. Founded in 1770, it employed 1600 workers in 1860 and closed in 1880. In Sicily (near Catania and Agrigento), sulfur was mined to make gunpowder. The Sicilian mines were able to satisfy most of the global demand for sulfur. Silk cloth production was focused in San Leucio (near Caserta). The region of Basilicata also had several mills in Potenza and San Chirico Raparo, where cotton, wool and silk were processed. Food processing was widespread, especially near Naples (Torre Annunziata and Gragnano).

Sulfur 

The kingdom maintained a large sulfur mining industry. In the increasingly industrialized Great Britain, with the repeal of tariffs on salt in 1824, demand for sulfur from Sicily surged. The growing British control and exploitation of the mining, refining, and transportation of sulfur, combined with the failure of this lucrative export to transform Sicily's backward and impoverished economy, led to the 'Sulfur Crisis' of 1840. This was precipitated when King Ferdinand II granted a monopoly of the sulfur industry to a French company, in violation of an 1816 trade agreement with Britain. A peaceful solution was eventually negotiated by France.

Transport

With all of its major cities boasting successful ports, transport and trade in the Kingdom of the Two Sicilies was most efficiently conducted by sea. The kingdom possessed the largest merchant fleet in the Mediterranean. Urban road conditions were to the best European standards; by 1839, the main streets of Naples were gas-lit. Efforts were made to tackle the tough mountainous terrain; Ferdinand II built the cliff-top road along the Sorrentine peninsula. Road conditions in the interior and hinterland areas of the kingdom made internal trade difficult. The first railways and iron-suspension bridges in Italy were developed in the south, as was the first overland electric telegraph cable.

Technological and scientific achievements
The kingdom achieved several scientific and technological accomplishments, such as the first steamboat in the Mediterrean Sea (1818), built in the shipyard of Stanislao Filosa al ponte di Vigliena, near Naples, and the first railway in the Italian peninsula (1839), which connected Naples to Portici. However, until the Italian unification, the railway development was highly limited. In the year 1859, the kingdom had only 99 kilometers of rail, compared to the 850 kilometers of Piedmont. Southern landscape was mainly mountainous so making the process of building railways was quite difficult, as building railway tunnels was much harder at the time. Other achievements included the first volcano observatory in the world, l'Osservatorio Vesuviano (1841). The rails for the first Italian railways were built in Mongiana as well. All the rails of the old railways that went from the south to as far as Bologna were built in Mongiana.

Education
The kingdom was home to three universities namely those in Naples founded in 1224, Catania founded in 1434 and Palermo founded in 1806. Also in Naples, established by Matteo Ripa in 1732, was the Collegio dei Cinesi today the University of Naples "L'Orientale teaching Sinology and Oriental studies. Despite these institutions of higher learning the kingdom however had no obligation for school attendance nor a recognizable school system. Clerics could inspect schools and had a veto power over appointments of teachers who were for the most part from the clergy anyhow. The literacy rate was just 14.4% in 1861.

Social spending and public hygiene 
The situation of the time in terms of social expenditure and public hygiene is mainly known today thanks to the writings of the historian and journalist Raffaele De Cesare. It is well known that public hygiene conditions in the regions of the Kingdom of the Two-Siciles are very poor and especially in the central and rural regions. Most small municipalities do not have sewers and have a low water supply due to the lack of public investment in the construction of pipes, which also means that most private houses do not have toilets. Paved roads are rare, except in the area around Naples or on the main roads of the country, and they are often flooded and have many potholes.

Moreover, most rural inhabitants often live in small old towns which, due to lack of social expenditure, become unhealthy, allowing many infectious diseases to spread rapidly. While the municipal administration has few economic means to remedy the situation, the gentlemen often have whole sections of streets paved in front of the entrance of their home

Geography

Departments

The peninsula was divided into fifteen departments and Sicily was divided into seven departments. The island itself had a special administrative status, with its base at Palermo. In 1860, when the Two Sicilies were conquered by the Kingdom of Sardinia, the departments became provinces of Italy, according to the Urbano Rattazzi law.  

Peninsula departments
  Province of Naples - Naples 
  Terra di Lavoro - Capua / Caserta from 1818
  Principato Citra - Salerno
  Principato Ultra - Avellino 
  Basilicata - Potenza
  Capitanata -  
  Terra di Bari - Bari
  Terra d'Otranto - Lecce
  Calabria Citra - Cosenza
  Calabria Ultra I - Reggio
  Calabria Ultra II - Catanzaro
  Contado di Molise - Campobasso
  Abruzzo Citra - Chieti
  Abruzzo Ultra I - Teramo
  Abruzzo Ultra II - Aquila

Insular departments
  Province of Caltanissetta - Caltanissetta
  Province of Catania - Catania
  Province of Girgenti - Girgenti
  Province of Messina - Messina
  Province of Noto - Noto
  Province of Palermo - Palermo
  Province of Trapani - Trapani

Monarchy

Kings of the Two Sicilies

In 1860–61 with influence from Great Britain and William Ewart Gladstone's propaganda, the kingdom was absorbed into the Kingdom of Sardinia, and the title dropped. It is still claimed by the head of the House of Bourbon-Two Sicilies.

Titles of King of the Two Sicilies

Francis I or Francis II, King of the Two Sicilies, of Jerusalem, etc., Duke of Parma, Piacenza, Castro, etc., Hereditary Grand Prince of Tuscany, etc.

Flags of the Kingdom of the Two Sicilies

Orders of knighthood
Order of St. Januarius
Sacred Military Constantinian Order of Saint George
Order of Saint George and Reunion
Order of Saint Ferdinand and Merit
Royal Order of Francis I

See also

 Dictatorship of Garibaldi
 List of historic states of Italy
 List of monarchs of the Kingdom of the Two Sicilies
 Southern Italy
 Southern Italy autonomist movements

References

Further reading
 Alio, Jacqueline. Sicilian Studies: A Guide and Syllabus for Educators (2018), 250 pp.
 
 Eckaus, Richard S. "The North-South differential in Italian economic development." Journal of Economic History (1961) 21#3 pp: 285–317.
 Finley, M. I., Denis Mack Smith and Christopher Duggan,  A History of Sicily (1987) abridged one-volume version of 3-volume set of 1969)
 Imbruglia, Girolamo, ed. Naples in the eighteenth century: The birth and death of a nation state (Cambridge University Press, 2000)
 Mendola, Louis. The Kingdom of the Two Sicilies 1734-1861 (2019)
 Petrusewicz, Marta. "Before the Southern Question: 'Native' Ideas on Backwardness and Remedies in the Kingdom of Two Sicilies, 1815–1849." in Italy's 'Southern Question''' (Oxford: Berg, 1998) pp: 27–50.
 Pinto, Carmine. "The 1860 disciplined Revolution. The Collapse of the Kingdom of the Two Sicilies." Contemporanea (2013) 16#1 pp: 39–68.
 Riall, Lucy. Sicily and the Unification of Italy: Liberal Policy & Local Power, 1859–1866 (1998), 252pp
 
  
  
 Zamagni, Vera. The economic history of Italy 1860–1990'' (Oxford University Press, 1993)

External links

 Brigantino – Il portale del Sud, a massive Italian-language site dedicated to the history, culture and arts of southern Italy
 Casa Editoriale Il Giglio, an Italian publisher that focuses on history, culture and the arts in the Two Sicilies
 La Voce di Megaride, a website by Marina Salvadore dedicated to Napoli and Southern Italy
 Associazione culturale "Amici di Angelo Manna", dedicated to the work of  Angelo Manna, historian, poet and deputy
 Fora! The e-journal of Nicola Zitara, professor; includes many articles about southern Italy's culture and history
Regalis, a website on Italian dynastic history, with sections on the House of the Two Sicilies

 
 
19th century in Sicily
History of Campania
History of Calabria
History of Apulia
History of Basilicata
Italian unification
States and territories established in 1816
1816 establishments in the Kingdom of the Two Sicilies
1861 disestablishments in the Kingdom of the Two Sicilies
Two Sicilies
Two Sicilies
Two Sicilies